The following buildings were added to the National Register of Historic Places as part of the Florida's Historic Black Public Schools Multiple Property Submission (or MPS).

Notes

2.  In 2007, the school building was demolished as part of a redevelopment project of the area.

External links

Article on the Orange City Colored School and Seth French House

Gallery

Black Public Schools
National Register of Historic Places Multiple Property Submissions in Florida
School buildings on the National Register of Historic Places in Florida
Historically segregated African-American schools in Florida